James Regan Penrice (born 22 December 1998) is a Scottish footballer who plays as a left-back for Livingston.

Club career

Partick Thistle
After progressing through the club's Thistle Weir Academy, Penrice made his senior debut in a 3–3 draw between Partick Thistle and Dundee United in which he was credited with an assist. He then made his home debut in a 2–2 draw with Hamilton Academical on the last day of the 2015–16 season, winning the man of the match award.

Penrice joined Scottish League One side East Fife on loan in December 2016, until the end of the season.
The following summer Penrice was then loaned to Livingston in August 2017 until January. After returning, he signed a contract with Thistle until 2020. Penrice scored his first goal for Thistle in a 2-1 win over Greenock Morton, in the League Cup. He scored his first league goal for Thistle in a 2-1 win over Falkirk. Penrice played every minute of the 2018–19 season for Thistle, becoming the first player to achieve that feat since 2006.

Penrice scored his first goal of the 2019–20 season in a 2-0 win over Welsh side Connah's Quay Nomads in the Scottish Challenge Cup. In January 2020, he signed a new one year contract extension with Thistle until the summer of 2021. After the 2019–20 season was ended early due to the Coronavirus pandemic, Partick Thistle were relegated for the second time in three seasons, now being relegated to League One. Penrice chose to stay at Thistle following their relegation making him and teammate Stuart Bannigan, the only two players left at the club from their time in the Premiership.

Penrice returned to Livingston on a permanent basis in June 2021.

Career statistics

Honours

Club

Partick Thistle
Scottish League One: 2020–21

References

External links

Living people
1998 births
Scottish footballers
Association football fullbacks
Partick Thistle F.C. players
East Fife F.C. players
Scottish Professional Football League players
Livingston F.C. players
Sportspeople from Livingston, West Lothian
Footballers from West Lothian